Providence High School may refer to:

Providence High School (North Carolina), Charlotte, North Carolina
Providence High School (Burbank, California)
Providence High School (San Antonio), San Antonio, Texas
Providence High School, Chicago, merged into Providence St. Mel School
Providence School, Jacksonville, Florida
Providence Catholic High School, New Lenox, Illinois
Our Lady of Providence Junior-Senior High School, Clarksville, Indiana
New Providence High School, New Providence, New Jersey